This is a list of the first minority male lawyer(s) and judge(s) in Oregon. It includes the year in which the men were admitted to practice law (in parentheses). Also included are men who achieved other distinctions such becoming the first in their state to graduate from law school or become a political figure.

Firsts in state history

Lawyers 

First Native American male: Silas B. Smith (1876) 
First African American male: McCants Stewart (1903) 
 First known Chinese American male: Seid Beck Jr. (1907) 
First Japanese American male: Minoru Yasui (c. 1939)  
First undocumented male: Thomas Kim in 2018

State judges 

 First African American male: Aaron Brown Jr. (1959) in 1969 
 First Latino American male: Joseph Ceniceros (1968) 
First openly gay male: David Gernant in 1994 
First openly gay male (Oregon Supreme Court): Rives Kistler (1981) in 2003  
First Hispanic American male (Chief Justice; Oregon Supreme Court): Paul De Muniz (1975) in 2006  
First Filipino American male (Oregon Court of Appeals): Steven Powers in 2017

Federal judges 
First Jewish American male (United States District Court for the District of Oregon): Gus J. Solomon in 1949 
First African American male (U.S. District Court for the District of Oregon): Ancer L. Haggerty (1973) in 1994  
First openly male (U.S. District Court for the District of Oregon): Michael J. McShane (1988) in 2013  
First Hispanic American male (Magistrate Judge; United States District Court for the District of Oregon): John Acosta in 2008 
First Hispanic American male (United States District Court for the District of Oregon): Marco A. Hernández in 2009  
First Muslim American male (Magistrate Judge; United States District Court for the District of Oregon): Mustafa T. Kasubhai in 2018

Assistant Attorney General 

 First African American male: H.J. Belton Hamilton in 1954

District Attorney 

 First Hispanic American male: John Haroldson in 2008

Political Office 

 First Taiwanese American male (U.S. House of Representatives): David Wu (1982) in 1999

Oregon State Bar Association 

 First Confederated Tribes of the Umatilla Indian Reservation male (admitted): William D. Johnson (1975)
 First openly gay male (president): Mark Johnson Roberts in 1998 
First Hispanic American male (president): Angel Lopez in 2002

Firsts in local history 
 Eddie Yoon (1976): Reputed to be the first Korean American male lawyer in the Pacific Northwest
Raymond Dean Crutchley (1999): First African American male judge in Eastern Oregon (2018)
John Haroldson: First Hispanic American male to serve as a District Attorney for Benton County, Oregon (2008)
Seid Beck Jr.: First Chinese American male to graduate from the University of Oregon School of Law (1907)
 Derrick Bell: First African American male to serve as the Dean of the University of Oregon School of Law (1981)
 Mustafa T. Kasubhai: First South East Asian male judge in Lane County, Oregon (2007)

See also 

 List of first minority male lawyers and judges in the United States

Other topics of interest 

 List of first women lawyers and judges in the United States
 List of first women lawyers and judges in Oregon

References 

Minority, Oregon, first
Minority, Oregon, first
 
Legal history of Oregon
Lists of people from Oklahoma